The 2011–12 season is Arema FC's 1st season since the inception of the Indonesia Premier League.

Players

First team squad

Transfers

In:

Out:

Indonesian Premier League

Table

Fixtures and results

2012 AFC Cup
Arema FC qualified for the 2012 AFC Cup as runners up in the 2010-11 Indonesia Super League. In December 2011, they were drawn in group H, along with Kelantan FA of Malaysia, Ayeyawady United F.C. of Myanmar and Navibank Saigon of Vietnam.

References

External links
 Arema Indonesia News Website
 Fans Website

Arema
Arema FC seasons